A total lunar eclipse will take place on May 6, 2069. The eclipse will be a dark one with the southern tip of the moon passing through the center of the Earth's shadow. This is the first central eclipse of Saros series 132.

It is the first of two total lunar eclipses in 2069, the second occurring at the descending node of the moon's orbit will be on October 30th which will also be a central total eclipse.

It is the third of an almost tetrad, the others being 17 May 2068 (P), 9 Nov 2068 (T) and 30 October 2069 (T).

Visibility 

The eclipse will be visible after sunset over Australia and begin before sunset over far eastern Asia, and be seen in the predawn hours over western North and South America.

The moon will also occult the bright star Alpha Librae as seen from the southern hemisphere a few hours before greatest eclipse.

Related lunar eclipses 

Lunar eclipses are related by many different eclipse cycles. The Saros cycle (18 years and 10 days) repeats the most consistently due three coinciding periods, and continue over 70 events (1200+ years). Eclipses are identified by a Saros number and a member index within each series.

The lunar year (354 days) and Metonic cycles (19 years) are short period last only 8 to 10 events. The Metonic cycle is equal to one Saros cycle plus one lunar year, and so the two series progress in parallel.

The Inex cycle (29 years minus 20 days) can last tens of thousands of years, so long that long perturbations in the moon's path must be taken into account for prediction. Also the eclipse qualities are less inconsistent because the moon is at different significantly positions in its elliptical orbit in sequential events. Similarly for the shorter Tritos cycle (10 years and 31 days), repeats less consistently for the same reason.

Lunar year series 

This eclipse is the third of four lunar year eclipses occurring at the moon's ascending node.

The lunar year series repeats after 12 lunations or 354 days (Shifting back about 10 days in sequential years). Because of the date shift, the Earth's shadow will be about 11 degrees west in sequential events.

Metonic series

Saros series

Tritos series

Inex series

Half-Saros cycle
A lunar eclipse will be preceded and followed by solar eclipses by 9 years and 5.5 days (a half saros). This lunar eclipse is related to two total solar eclipses of Solar Saros 139.

See also 
List of lunar eclipses and List of 21st-century lunar eclipses

Notes

External links 
 NASA: Lunar Eclipses: Past and Future
 
 Index to Five Millennium Catalog of Lunar Eclipses, -1999 to +3000 (2000 BCE to 3000 CE)
 Eclipses: 2001 to 2100

References 
 Bao-Lin Liu, Canon of Lunar Eclipses 1500 B.C.-A.D. 3000, 1992

2069-05
2069-05
2069 in science
Central total lunar eclipses